Tarup is a residential village and western suburb of  Odense, in Funen, Denmark.  It is located immediately to the northeast of Villestofte.

References

Suburbs of Odense
Populated places in Funen